Kharif crops, also known as monsoon crops or autumn crops, are domesticated plants that are cultivated and harvested in India, Pakistan and Bangladesh during the Indian subcontinent's monsoon season, which lasts from June to November depending on the area.  Monsoon rains may begin as early as May in some parts of the Indian subcontinent, and crops are generally harvested from the third week of September to October. Rice, maize, and cotton are some of the major Kharif crops in India. Unlike the Rabi crops, which are grown in the winter, the kharif crops require good rainfall.

Etymology
The words Kharif and rabi both have their origins in the Arabic language. These came to be used in India with the ascent of the Mughal Empire in the Indian subcontinent and have been widely used ever since. Kharif literally means "autumn" in Arabic. The sowing happens during monsoon and reaping happens close to Autumn in the Indian subcontinent ; this proximity to Autumn reap season is called the Kharif period.

Kharif season
The Kharif season varies by crop and region, starting at the earliest in May and ending at the latest in January. In India, the season is popularly considered to start in June and end in October. Kharif crops are usually sown at the beginning of the first rains during the advent of the south-west monsoon season, and they are harvested at the end of monsoon season (October–November).

Monsoon sowing dates vary, occurring toward the end of May in the southern state of Kerala and reaching July in some north Indian states. In other regions like Maharashtra, the west coast of India, and Pakistan, which receive rains in June, Kharif crops are sown in May, June and July. In Bangladesh, Kharif crops are usually sown with the beginning of the first rains in June.

These crops are dependent on the quantity of rainwater as well as its timing. Too much, too little, or rain at the wrong time may lay waste to the whole year's efforts.

Kharif crops stand in contrast to the rabi crops, which are cultivated during the dry season.

Common kharif crops
Rice is the most important Kharif crop of India. It is grown in rain-fed areas with hot and humid climates, especially the eastern and southern parts of India. Rice requires a temperature of  during the growing season and  during ripening.

Cereals 
 Jowar
 Maize (corn)
 Millet
 Rice (paddy and deepwater rice)

Fruits 
In Kharif crop following fruits are produced:
Almonds
Apples
Apricots
Bananas
Cantaloupe
Chikoo
Coconut
Dates
Figs
Guava
Jaman
Litchi
Luffa
Mango
Muskmelon
Orange
Pomegrante
Plums
Pears
Phalsa
Papaya
Peaches
Sarda
Sugarcane
Walnut
Watermelon

Seed plants 
 Arhar (tur)
 Black gram (urad)
 Cotton
 Cowpea (chavala)
 Green gram (moong)
 Groundnut
 Guar
 Moth bean
 Mung bean
 Sesame (til)
 Soybean
 Urad bean
 Red gram (Pegion pea)
 Fennel (Saunf)

Vegetables 
List as follows:
 Bitter gourd (karela)
 Bottle gourd 
 Brinjal 
 Chili 
 Green bean
 Ladies' fingers 
 Sponge gourd 
 Tinda
 Tomato
 Turmeric

See also

 Rabi crop
 Zaid crops
 Cash crop

References

External links
 E2kB Farming – Rabi, Kharif and Zayad Crops – Animal Husbandry – Fishery

Crops
Agriculture in India
Agriculture in Pakistan